Heliangara macaritis is a moth in the family Autostichidae. It was described by Edward Meyrick in 1910. It is found in India (Bengal, Bombay).

The wingspan is 13–14 mm. The forewings are bright deep coppery purple and the hindwings are dark fuscous.

References

Moths described in 1910
Autostichinae